Stegnogramma pilosa, synonym Thelypteris pilosa, is a fern species in the family Thelypteridaceae. It is closely related to Stegnogramma burksiorum (syn. Thelypteris burksiorum); the two have been treated as a species complex. Stegnogramma pilosa is native to Mexico, Guatemala and Honduras.

When combined with S. burksiorum, it has been called hairy maiden fern, softhairy maiden fern, and streak-sorus fern.

References

Thelypteridaceae
Flora of Guatemala
Flora of Honduras
Flora of Mexico